Kristen Towers (born 12 October 1976) is a retired field hockey player from Australia, who played as a midfielder.

Personal life
Kristen Towers was born and raised in Taree, New South Wales.

Towers has an identical twin sister, Julie, who was also a member of the Hockeyroos.

Career

Domestic hockey
Throughout her career, Towers was a member of the NSWIS Arrows in the Australian Hockey League.

International hockey

Under–21
In 1997, Towers was a member of the Australia U–21 team at the FIH Junior World Cup in Seongnam. Australia won a silver medal at the tournament, with Towers scoring on four occasions.

Hockeyroos
Kristen Towers made her official debut for the Hockeyroos in 1998. Later that year she was included in the Commonwealth Games team to compete in Kuala Lumpur. There, she won her first medal with the national team, taking home gold.

1999 proved to be a good year for Towers, winning her second and third gold medals for Australia. Her first was at the FIH Champions Trophy in Brisbane, followed by the Oceania Cup, held across Australia and New Zealand.

After only two appearances in 2000, Towers returned to the international fold in 2001. During the year, she won gold at the Oceania Cup in New Zealand, followed by bronze at the FIH Champions Trophy in Amsterdam.

International goals

References

External links

1976 births
Living people
Female field hockey midfielders
Australian female field hockey players
Commonwealth Games gold medallists for Australia
Commonwealth Games medallists in field hockey
Field hockey players at the 1998 Commonwealth Games
Australian twins
Twin sportspeople
People from Taree
Sportswomen from New South Wales
Medallists at the 1998 Commonwealth Games